The 1991 Big East men's basketball tournament took place at Madison Square Garden in New York City, from March 7 to March 10, 1991. Its winner received the Big East Conference's automatic bid to the 1991 NCAA tournament. It is a single-elimination tournament with four rounds.  Syracuse finished with the best regular season conference record and was awarded the #1 seed.

Seton Hall defeated Georgetown in the championship game 74–62, to claim its first Big East tournament championship.

Bracket

Awards
Dave Gavitt Trophy (Most Valuable Player): Oliver Taylor, Seton Hall

All Tournament Team
 Anthony Avent, Seton Hall
 Marc Dowdell, Villanova
 Alonzo Mourning, Georgetown
 Eric Murdock, Providence
 Dikembe Mutombo, Georgetown
 Oliver Taylor, Seton Hall

External links

References

Tournament
Big East men's basketball tournament
Basketball competitions in New York City
College sports in New York City
Sports in Manhattan
Big East men's basketball tournament
Big East men's basketball tournament
1990s in Manhattan
Madison Square Garden